Aurel Vlaicu International Airport  (largely known as Băneasa Airport or Bucharest City Airport) is located in Băneasa district, Bucharest, Romania,  north of the city center. Named after Aurel Vlaicu, a Romanian engineer, inventor, aeroplane constructor, and early pilot, it was Bucharest's only airport until 1969, when the Otopeni Airport (today Henri Coandă International Airport) was opened to civilian use.

Until March 2012, when it was converted into a business airport, Aurel Vlaicu International was the second airport in Romania in terms of air traffic, and Bucharest's low-cost airline hub.

History

In 1912, one of first flight schools in Romania was opened on the Băneasa airfield by George Valentin Bibescu. This makes Băneasa airport the oldest continuously operating airport in Eastern Europe, and among the five oldest airports in the world.

In 1922, the airport headquartered the first aviation company in Romania, and one of the earliest in the world, CFRNA (The French–Romanian Company for Air Navigation), the precursor of the Romanian national airline, TAROM. In 1923, CFRNA built the industrial facilities for aircraft maintenance in Băneasa. These facilities preceded the aerospace company Romaero.

The current terminal building was designed in the late 1940s and opened in 1952. At that time it was considered one of the finest architectural features of Bucharest. The building consists of a central dome with three distinct wings which represents an airplane propeller with three blades.

During the communist period (1947–1989), Băneasa Airport was TAROM's domestic hub, while Otopeni Airport was used as an international hub. In the early 2000s (decade), TAROM moved all of its activities to Otopeni (renamed Henri Coandă International Airport).

The 2007 low cost "invasion"

The first low cost airline established at BBU was Blue Air in 2004. From January 2007, the low-fare airlines Wizz Air, EasyJet, and Germanwings started European routes from Băneasa.

Renovation works
In 2007, the airport was closed from 10 May to 19 August for renovation works. All flights during this period were moved to Henri Coandă International Airport. Renovations included commercial areas, restaurants, a VIP lounge and a 300-space car park. The runway and lighting systems were also completely overhauled. The estimated cost was €20m.

Conversion into a business airport
In March 2012, Băneasa was dedicated to business air traffic. The low-cost traffic was transferred to Henri Coandă International Airport.

Possible re-opening
In 2017 and 2018, public talks organized by the managing company took place, suggesting that the airport may be re-opened for regular flights, following renovation works, that may be completed in two years from start.

In June 2019, it was announced that the airport will reopen for commercial flights in early 2020.

Re-opening
On 1 August 2022, the airport was re-opened after 10 years of renovation work and 110 years since it was founded. The first scheduled flight will be operated in 14 April 2023, to Antalya.

Terminals
The building is a late 1940s design, and was not built to cope with more than 600,000 passengers per year and departures every 25 minutes. As such in the few years before 2012 when the airport was closed to commercial scheduled flights, the facilities were extremely undersized and became very crowded. The building cannot be expanded, because of its status as a city landmark, and because of the sheer lack of space in the airport area.

Airlines and destinations
All scheduled flight operations have been moved to Henri Coandă International Airport in Otopeni in 25 March 2012. The first scheduled flight will be operated by the start-up carrier Fly Lili in 14 April 2023, operating a charter flight to Antalya.

Traffic statistics
From as low as 20 to 30 passengers per month in 2001–2002, BBU handled 119,000 passengers in 2004, and 2,398,911 passengers in 2011.

Bucharest International Air Show
The airport has been the set where the Bucharest International Air Show, the largest of its kind in Romania, has been taking place. In 2018, this event had its tenth edition, with 150 aircraft on the ground and on display in the air and 100 pilots and paratroopers, from 13 countries.

Ground transportation
The airport is situated 8 km (5 miles) north of Bucharest city centre and is accessible by STB buses, trams and Airport Express. Taxis and ride-sharing services are also present and accessible.

An extension of the Bucharest Metro system to Aurel Vlaicu International, as Metro Line M6, which will link it to the Main Train Station and the larger Henri Coandă International Airport, was approved in June 2006 and is currently in its planning stage.

See also
Aviation in Romania
Transport in Romania

References

External links

 Official website
 Google Map – Aerial View

Transport in Bucharest
Airports in Romania
Airports established in 1912
Buildings and structures in Bucharest
Historic monuments in Bucharest
1912 establishments in Romania
Airfields of the United States Army Air Forces Air Transport Command in the European Theater
Aurel Vlaicu
Băneasa